Scorsese is an Italian American surname (originally Scozzese in Italy, meaning Scotsman or Scottish). Notable people with the surname include:
Catherine Scorsese (1912–1997), American actress
Charles Scorsese (1913–1993), American actor
Martin Scorsese (b. 1942), American film director, writer, and producer

References

Italian-language surnames